Rubén Darío Gigena (born 2 October 1980 in Bahía Blanca, province of Buenos Aires) is a retired Argentine football forward.

Career
His former club include Newell's Old Boys in Argentina, Bolivian side The Strongest, Libertad, Cerro Porteño and Club Sportivo Luqueño from Paraguay, besides Cruz Azul (Oaxaca) and Indios de Ciudad Juárez in Mexico and Chilean clubs Santiago Wanderers and Deportes Iquique.

References

External links
 Argentine Primera statistics at Fútbol XXI 

1980 births
Living people
Sportspeople from Bahía Blanca
Association football forwards
Argentine footballers
Argentine expatriate footballers
Newell's Old Boys footballers
The Strongest players
Club Libertad footballers
Cerro Porteño players
Audax Italiano footballers
Santiago Wanderers footballers
Sportivo Luqueño players
Al-Qadsiah FC players
Deportes Iquique footballers
Sol de América de Formosa players
Chilean Primera División players
Primera B de Chile players
Paraguayan Primera División players
Argentine Primera División players
Torneo Argentino A players
Torneo Argentino B players
Expatriate footballers in Peru
Argentine expatriate sportspeople in Peru
Expatriate footballers in Paraguay
Argentine expatriate sportspeople in Paraguay
Expatriate footballers in Bolivia
Argentine expatriate sportspeople in Bolivia
Expatriate footballers in Chile
Argentine expatriate sportspeople in Chile
Expatriate footballers in Mexico
Argentine expatriate sportspeople in Mexico
Expatriate footballers in Saudi Arabia
Argentine expatriate sportspeople in Saudi Arabia